Dihydroxymethylidene or carbonous acid is a chemical compound with formula C(OH)2. It is an unstable tautomer of formic acid. There is no evidence that this compound exists in solution, but the molecule has been detected in the gas phase.  Many related carbenes are known, although they are often transient.

Production and properties
Dihydroxymethylidene is produced in the gas phase by high vacuum flash vacuum pyrolysis of oxalic acid:
C2O4H2   →  C(OH)2  +  CO2
The species is a bent molecule with an O−C−O angle of 105.6° for the C2v all-trans rotamer.  Although stable at 10 K, at higher temperatures it isomerizes to formic acid.

The double ionized ion, is known as the carbonite ion

References 

Diols
Carbenes
Free radicals
Hydroxides